The Bidwell Bar Bridge, in Oroville, California, refers to two suspension bridges that cross different parts of Lake Oroville. The original Bidwell Bar Bridge was the first steel suspension bridge in California. The $35,000,  original was completed in December 1855, and was built of materials transported from Troy, New York, via Cape Horn. Most of the money was put up by Judge Joseph Lewis, a Virginian who moved to Bidwell's Bar in 1849. The bridge originally crossed the Middle Fork Feather River and is the only one of several suspension bridges built in the area in the 1850s that still remains. It remained open to vehicle traffic until 1954.

Construction of the Oroville Dam flooded the canyon where the Feather River ran as well as the town of Bidwell's Bar, and preservationists arranged for the relocation of the bridge in 1966 to the south side of the lake, where it is still open to foot traffic. Its original site is now inundated by the lake.

The bridge is built a mile and a half upstream from its original location. The bridge is signed as part of State Route 162.

The original bridge is registered as a California Historical Landmark and it was declared a National Historic Civil Engineering Landmark by the American Society of Civil Engineers. The Mother Orange Tree, the first orange tree in Northern California (purchased by Judge Lewis), is located near the California landmark commemorative plaque.

See also
List of bridges documented by the Historic American Engineering Record in California

References

External links

ASCE Historic Civil Engineering Landmark- Bidwell Bar Suspension Bridge
Bridgemeister.com — entry for the 1855 Bidwell Bar Bridge
Bridgemeister.com — entry for the 1967 Bidwell Bar Bridge

 (original span)
 (current span)

Bridges in Butte County, California
Road bridges in California
Pedestrian bridges in California
Suspension bridges in California
Bridges completed in 1855
Bridges completed in 1967
Feather River
Former road bridges in the United States
California Historical Landmarks
Historic American Buildings Survey in California
Historic American Engineering Record in California
Historic Civil Engineering Landmarks
Oroville, California
Relocated buildings and structures in California
Steel bridges in the United States
1855 establishments in California